Fiona ("Fi") Hammond (born 10 May 1983 in Sydney) is an Australian water polo player, who joined the Women's National Team in 2006. She was a member of the side that won the gold medal at the 2006 FINA Women's Water Polo World Cup.

References
 Profile

1983 births
Living people
Australian female water polo players
Sportswomen from New South Wales
Water polo players from Sydney